Kasperbauer is a surname. Notable people with the surname include:

Carmen A. Kasperbauer, Guamanian politician
Kyle Kasperbauer, member of the 2007 United States men's national American football team
Lawrence F. Kasperbauer, Guamanian politician, member of 27th Guam Legislature and 28th Guam Legislature
Travis Kasperbauer, former member of American hard rock band Travis Kasperbauer